Sean O'Neill (born 11 April 1988) is a sportsperson from Northern Ireland. He currently plays association football for  NIFL Premiership club Ballymena United. He has also played inter-county Gaelic football for Antrim.

Club career
Sean began his career at Glentoran, before moving to Ballymena United in March 2005. He spent 5 years at United, starting as back up to Alan Blayney, and then when Blayney left, O'Neill was first choice although never really established himself in the first team, making a total of 21 appearances during his time there.

He signed for Dungannon Swifts in the summer of 2010 as a replacement for Alvin Rouse, and established himself as first choice keeper, playing in 36 of 38 league games. His performances led to praise, with good displays combined with playing as goalkeeper for Antrim GAA drawing plaudits.

He signed for Crusaders in the summer of 2011, replacing outgoing keeper Chris Keenan. He ceased playing GAA not long after joining.

O'Neill became Crusaders' regular number one, until dislocating his shoulder on 12 January 2013 in an Irish Cup tie against Linfield. Although expected to be out for the rest of the season, he returned in time for the Irish Cup semi-final against Cliftonville on 6 April.

The season 2014–15 was a very successful season for O'Neill as Crusaders lifted the Gibson Cup. Due to his performances throughout the season, O'Neill was selected in the Northern Ireland Football Writers Team of the year.

On 31 January 2022, O'Neill returned to former club Ballymena United on loan for the remainder of the 2021–22 season. He re-joined the club permanently on 16 June 2022, signing a three-year contract.

International career
He has represented Northern Ireland at U17, U18, U19, U21, and U23 level.

Honours
Crusaders
 NIFL Premiership (3): 2014–15, 2015–16, 2017–18
 Irish Cup (1): 2018–19
 Irish League Cup (1): 2011–12
 Setanta Cup (1): 2012
 County Antrim Shield (2): 2017–18, 2018–19

References

1988 births
Living people
Antrim inter-county Gaelic footballers
Association footballers from Northern Ireland
Ballymena United F.C. players
Crusaders F.C. players
Dungannon Swifts F.C. players
Gaelic footballers who switched code
Gaelic football goalkeepers
Glentoran F.C. players
Association footballers from Belfast
Association football goalkeepers